Al-Busayrah is a town in eastern Syria, administratively part of the Deir ez-Zor Governorate. The town is located, at the confluence of the Euphrates and Khabur Rivers, southeast of Deir ez-Zor. Nearby localities include Muhassan to the northwest and al-Asharah, Mayadin and Hajin to the southeast. According to the Syria Central Bureau of Statistics (CBS), Al-Busayrah had a population of 6,199 in the 2004 census. The town was known by its Latin name, Circesium, under the Roman Empire.

During the Syrian Civil War, the city was part of the Islamic State of Iraq and the Levant until the Syrian Democratic Forces captured it on 12 November 2017, bringing it under the Autonomous Administration of North and East Syria.

Climate
In Al-Busayrah, there is a desert climate. Most rain falls in the winter. The Köppen-Geiger climate classification is BWh. About  of precipitation falls annually.

References

Populated places in Deir ez-Zor District
Populated places on the Euphrates River
Towns in Syria